Focus on Autism and Other Developmental Disabilities is a peer-reviewed academic journal covering the field of special education and learning disabilities. The editors-in-chief are Alisa K. Lowrey (University of Southern Mississippi) and Kevin M. Ayres (The University of Georgia). It was established in 1986 and is published by SAGE Publications in association with the Hammill Institute on Disabilities.

Abstracting and indexing 
The journal is abstracted and indexed in Scopus and the Social Sciences Citation Index. According to the Journal Citation Reports, its 2017 impact factor is 0.959, ranking it 29th out of 40 journals in the category "Education, Special", 51st out of 69 journals in the category "Rehabilitation", and 65th out of 73 journals in the category "Psychology, Developmental".

References

External links 
 
 Hammill Institute

SAGE Publishing academic journals
English-language journals
Quarterly journals
Publications established in 1986
Special education journals